The Hollywood Walk of Fame is a historic landmark which consists of more than 2,700 five-pointed terrazzo and brass stars embedded in the sidewalks along 15 blocks of Hollywood Boulevard and three blocks of Vine Street in Hollywood, California. The stars are permanent public monuments to achievement in the entertainment industry, bearing the names of a mix of actors, directors, producers, musicians, theatrical/musical groups, fictional characters, and others.

The Walk of Fame is administered by the Hollywood Chamber of Commerce who hold the trademark rights and maintained by the self-financing Hollywood Historic Trust. It is a popular tourist attraction, with an estimated 10 million annual visitors in 2010.

Description 
According to a 2003 report by the market research firm NPO Plog Research, the Walk attracts about 10 million visitors annually—more than the Sunset Strip, the TCL Chinese Theatre (formerly Grauman's), the Queen Mary, and the Los Angeles County Museum of Art combined—and has played an important role in making tourism the largest industry in Los Angeles County.

Categorization 
, the Walk of Fame comprises 2,752 stars, which are spaced at  intervals. The monuments are coral-pink terrazzo five-point stars rimmed with brass (not bronze, an oft-repeated inaccuracy) inlaid into a charcoal-colored terrazzo background. The name of the honoree is inlaid in brass block letters in the upper portion of each star. Below the inscription, in the lower half of the star field, a round inlaid brass emblem indicates the category of the honoree's contributions. The emblems symbolize five categories within the entertainment industry:

Of all the stars on the Walk to date, 47% have been awarded in the motion pictures category, 24% in television, 17% in audio recording, 10% in radio, and fewer than 2% in the live performance category. According to the Hollywood Chamber of Commerce, approximately 20 new stars are added to the Walk each year.

Star locations 
Locations of individual stars are not necessarily arbitrary. Stars of many particularly well-known celebrities are found in front of the TCL (formerly Grauman's) Chinese Theatre. Oscar-winners' stars are usually placed near the Dolby Theatre, site of the annual Academy Awards presentations. Locations are occasionally chosen for ironic or humorous reasons: Mike Myers's star lies in front of an adult store called the International Love Boutique, an association with his Austin Powers roles; Roger Moore's star and Daniel Craig's star are located at 7007 Hollywood Boulevard in recognition of their titular role in the James Bond 007 film series; Ed O'Neill's star is located outside a shoe store in reference to his character's occupation on the TV show Married ... with Children; and the last star, at the very end of the westernmost portion of the Walk, belongs to The Dead End Kids.

Honorees may request a specific location for their star, although final decisions remain with the Chamber. Jay Leno, for example, requested a spot near the corner of Hollywood Blvd. and Highland Ave. because he was twice picked up at that location by police for vagrancy (though never actually charged) shortly after his arrival in Hollywood. George Carlin chose to have his star placed in front of the KDAY radio station near the corner of Sunset Blvd. and Vine St., where he first gained national recognition. Lin-Manuel Miranda chose a site in front of the Pantages Theatre where his musicals, In The Heights and Hamilton, played. Carol Burnett explained her choice in her 1986 memoir: While working as an usherette at the historic Warner Brothers Theatre (now the Hollywood Pacific Theatre) during the 1951 run of Alfred Hitchcock's film Strangers on a Train, she took it upon herself to advise a couple arriving during the final few minutes of a showing to wait for the next showing, to avoid seeing (and spoiling) the ending. The theater manager fired her on the spot for "insubordination" and humiliated her by stripping the epaulets from her uniform in the theater lobby. Twenty-six years later, at her request, Burnett's star was placed at the corner of Hollywood and Wilcox—in front of the theater.

Alternative star designs 
Special category stars recognize various contributions by corporate entities, service organizations, and special honorees, and display emblems unique to those honorees. For example, former Los Angeles mayor Tom Bradley's star displays the Seal of the City of Los Angeles; the Los Angeles Police Department (LAPD) star emblem is a replica of a Hollywood Division badge; and stars representing corporations, such as Victoria's Secret and the Los Angeles Dodgers, display the honoree's corporate logo. The "Friends of the Walk of Fame" monuments are charcoal terrazzo squares rimmed by miniature pink terrazzo stars displaying the five standard category emblems, along with the sponsor's corporate logo, with the sponsor's name and contribution in inlaid brass block lettering.  Special stars and Friends monuments are granted by the Hollywood Chamber of Commerce or the Hollywood Historic Trust, but are not part of the Walk of Fame proper and are located nearby on private property.

The monuments for the Apollo 11 mission to the Moon are uniquely shaped: Four identical circular moons, each bearing the names of the three astronauts (Neil A. Armstrong, Edwin E. Aldrin Jr., and Michael Collins), the date of the first Moon landing ("7/20/69"), and the words "Apollo XI", are set on each of the four corners of the intersection of Hollywood and Vine.

History

Origin 

The Hollywood Chamber of Commerce credits E.M. Stuart, its volunteer president in 1953, with the original idea for creating a Walk of Fame. Stuart reportedly proposed the Walk as a means to "maintain the glory of a community whose name means glamour and excitement in the four corners of the world". Harry Sugarman, another Chamber member and president of the Hollywood Improvement Association, received credit in an independent account. A committee was formed to flesh out the idea, and an architectural firm was retained to develop specific proposals. By 1955, the basic concept and general design had been agreed upon, and plans were submitted to the Los Angeles City Council.

Multiple accounts exist for the origin of the star concept. According to one, the historic Hollywood Hotel—which stood for more than 50 years on Hollywood Boulevard at the site now occupied by the Hollywood and Highland complex and the Dolby (formerly Kodak) Theatre—displayed stars on its dining room ceiling above the tables favored by its most famous celebrity patrons, and that may have served as an early inspiration. By another account, the stars were "inspired ... by Sugarman's Tropics Restaurant drinks menu, which featured celebrity photos framed in gold stars".

In February 1956, a prototype was unveiled featuring a caricature of an example honoree (John Wayne, by some accounts) inside a blue star on a brown background. However, caricatures proved too expensive and difficult to execute in brass with the technology available at the time; and the brown and blue motif was vetoed by Charles E. Toberman, the legendary real estate developer known as "Mr. Hollywood", because the colors clashed with a new building he was erecting on Hollywood Boulevard.

Selection and construction 
By March 1956, the final design and coral-and-charcoal color scheme had been approved. Between the spring of 1956 and the fall of 1957, 1,558 honorees were selected by committees representing the four major branches of the entertainment industry at that time: motion pictures, television, audio recording, and radio. The committees met at the Brown Derby restaurant, and included such prominent names as Cecil B. DeMille, Samuel Goldwyn, Jesse L. Lasky, Walt Disney, Hal Roach, Mack Sennett, and Walter Lantz.

A requirement stipulated by the original audio recording committee (and later rescinded) specified minimum sales of one million records or 250,000 albums for all music category nominees. The committee soon realized that many important recording artists would be excluded from the Walk by that requirement. As a result, the National Academy of Recording Arts and Sciences was formed to create a separate award for the music industry, leading to the first Grammy Awards in 1959.

Construction of the Walk began in 1958 but two lawsuits delayed completion. The first lawsuit was filed by local property owners challenging the legality of the $1.25 million tax assessment levied upon them to pay for the Walk, along with new street lighting and trees. In October 1959, the assessment was ruled legal. The second lawsuit, filed by Charles Chaplin Jr., sought damages for the exclusion of his father, whose nomination had been withdrawn due to pressure from multiple quarters (see Controversial additions). Chaplin's suit was dismissed in 1960, paving the way for completion of the project.

While Joanne Woodward is often singled out as the first person to receive a star on the Walk of Fame—possibly because she was the first to be photographed with it—the original stars were installed as a continuous project, with no individual ceremonies. Woodward's name was one of eight drawn at random from the original 1,558 and inscribed on eight prototype stars that were built while litigation was holding up permanent construction. The eight prototypes were installed temporarily on the northwest corner of Hollywood Boulevard and Highland Avenue in August 1958 to generate publicity and to demonstrate how the Walk would eventually look. The other seven names were Olive Borden, Ronald Colman, Louise Fazenda, Preston Foster, Burt Lancaster, Edward Sedgwick, and Ernest Torrence. Official groundbreaking took place on February 8, 1960. On March 28, 1960, the first permanent star, director Stanley Kramer's, was completed on the easternmost end of the new Walk near the intersection of Hollywood and Gower.

Stagnation and revitalization 
Though the Walk was originally conceived in part to encourage redevelopment of Hollywood Boulevard, the 1960s and 1970s were periods of protracted urban decay in the Hollywood area as residents moved to nearby suburbs. After the initial installation of approximately 1,500 stars in 1960 and 1961, eight years passed without the addition of a new star. In 1962, the Los Angeles City Council passed an ordinance naming the Hollywood Chamber of Commerce "the agent to advise the City" about adding names to the Walk, and the Chamber, over the following six years, devised rules, procedures, and financing methods to do so.
In December 1968, Richard D. Zanuck was awarded the first star in eight years in a presentation ceremony hosted by Danny Thomas.  In July 1978, the City of Los Angeles designated the Hollywood Walk of Fame a Los Angeles Historic-Cultural Monument.

Radio personality, television producer and Chamber member Johnny Grant is generally credited with implementing the changes that resuscitated the Walk and established it as a significant tourist attraction. Beginning in 1968, Grant stimulated publicity and encouraged international press coverage by requiring that each recipient personally attend his or her star's unveiling ceremony. Grant later recalled that "it was tough to get people to come accept a star" until the neighborhood finally began its recovery in the 1980s. In 1980, he instituted a fee of $2,500, payable by the person or entity nominating the recipient, to fund the Walk of Fame's upkeep and minimize further taxpayer burden. The fee has increased incrementally over time; by 2002 it had reached $15,000, and stood at $30,000 in 2012. , the fee is $50,000.

Grant was awarded a star in 1980 for his television work. In 2002, he received a second star in the "special" category to acknowledge his pivotal role in improving and popularizing the Walk. He was also named chairman of the Selection Committee and Honorary Mayor of Hollywood (a ceremonial position previously held by Art Linkletter and Monty Hall, among others). He remained in both offices from 1980 until his death in 2008 and hosted the great majority of unveiling ceremonies during that period. His unique special-category star, with its emblem depicting a stylized "Great Seal of the City of Hollywood", is located at the entrance to the Dolby Theatre adjacent to Johnny Grant Way.

Expansion 
In 1984, a fifth category, Live Theatre, was added to acknowledge contributions from the live performance branch of the entertainment industry, and a second row of stars was created on each sidewalk to alternate with the existing stars.

In 1994, the Walk of Fame was extended one block to the west on Hollywood Boulevard, from Sycamore Avenue to North LaBrea Avenue (plus the short segment of Marshfield Way that connects Hollywood and La Brea), where it now ends at the silver "Four Ladies of Hollywood" gazebo and the special "Walk of Fame" star. At the same time, Sophia Loren was honored with the 2,000th star on the Walk.

During construction of tunnels for the Los Angeles subway system in 1996, the Metropolitan Transportation Authority (MTA) removed and stored more than 300 stars.  Controversy arose when the MTA proposed a money-saving measure of jackhammering the 3-by-3-foot terrazzo pads, preserving only the brass lettering, surrounds, and medallions, then pouring new terrazzo after the tunnels were completed; but the Cultural Heritage Commission ruled that the star pads were to be removed intact.

Restoration 
In 2008 a long-term restoration project began with an evaluation of all 2,365 stars on the Walk at the time, each receiving a letter grade of A, B, C, D, or F. Honorees whose stars received F grades, indicating the most severe damage, were Joan Collins, Peter Frampton, Dick Van Patten, Paul Douglas, Andrew L. Stone, Willard Waterman, Richard Boleslavsky, Ellen Drew, Frank Crumit, and Bobby Sherwood. Fifty celebrities' stars received "D" grades. The damage ranged from minor cosmetic flaws caused by normal weathering to holes and fissures severe enough to constitute a walking hazard. Plans were made to repair or replace at least 778 stars at an estimated cost of over $4 million.

The restoration is a collaboration among the Hollywood Chamber of Commerce and various Los Angeles city and county governmental offices, along with the MTA, which operates the Metro B Line that runs beneath the Walk, since earth movement due to the presence of the subway line is thought to be partly responsible for the damage.

To encourage supplemental funding for the project by corporate sponsors, the "Friends of Walk of Fame" program was inaugurated, with donors recognized through honorary plaques adjacent to the Walk of Fame in front of the Dolby Theatre. The program has received some criticism; Alana Semuels of the Los Angeles Times described it as "just the latest corporate attempt to buy some good buzz," and quoted a brand strategist who said, "I think Johnny Grant would roll over in his grave."

Los Angeles introduced the "Heart of Hollywood Master Plan". Promotes the idea of closing Hollywood Boulevard to traffic and create a Pedestrian zone from La Brea Avenue to Highland Avenue citing an increase in pedestrian traffic including tourism, weekly movie premiers and award shows closures, including 10 days for the Academy Award ceremony at the Dolby Theatre. In June 2019, The City of Los Angeles commissioned Gensler architects to provide a master plan for a $4 million renovation to improve and "update the streetscape concept" for the Walk of Fame. Los Angeles City Councilmember Mitch O’Farrell released the draft master plan designed by Gensler and Studio-MLA in January 2020. It proposed widening the sidewalks, adding bike lanes, new landscaping, sidewalk dining, removing lanes of car traffic and street parking between the Pantages Theater (Gower Street) at the east and The Emerson Theatre (La Brea Avenue) at the west end of the boulevard. The approved phase one includes removing the parking lanes between Orange Drive and Gower Street, adding street furnishings with benches, tables and chairs with sidewalk widening. Phase two is in the schematic stage. Phase two is planned for 2024 and will include closing down the boulevard to two lanes, adding landscaping with shade trees and five public plazas made up of art deco designed street pavers and kiosks. To be completed by 2026. Funding is being raised for the $50 million dollar project.

Nomination process 

Each year an average of 200 nominations are submitted to the Hollywood Chamber of Commerce Walk of Fame selection committee. Anyone, including fans, can nominate anyone active in the field of entertainment as long as the nominee or their management approves the nomination. Nominees must have a minimum of five years' experience in the category for which they are nominated and a history of "charitable contributions". Posthumous nominees must have been deceased at least five years. At a meeting each June, the committee selects approximately 20 to 24 celebrities to receive stars on the Walk of Fame. One posthumous award is given each year as well. The nominations of those not selected are rolled over to the following year for reconsideration; those not selected two years in a row are dropped, and must be renominated to receive further consideration. Living recipients must agree to personally attend a presentation ceremony within two years of selection. If the ceremony is not scheduled within two years, a new application must be submitted. A relative of deceased recipients must attend posthumous presentations. Presentation ceremonies are open to the public.

A fee of $55,000, payable at time of selection, is collected to pay for the creation and installation of the star, as well as general maintenance of the Walk of Fame. The fee is usually paid by the nominating organization, which may be a fan club, film studio, record company, broadcaster, or other sponsor involved with the prospective honoree. The Starz cable network, for example, paid for Dennis Hopper's star as part of the promotion for its series Crash.

Traditionally, the identities of selection committee members, other than its chairman, have not been made public in order to minimize conflicts of interest and to discourage lobbying by celebrities and their representatives (a significant problem during the original selections in the late 1950s). However, in 1999, in response to intensifying charges of secrecy in the selection process, the Chamber disclosed the members' names: Johnny Grant, the longtime chair and representative of the television category; Earl Lestz, president of Paramount Studio Group (motion pictures); Stan Spero, retired manager with broadcast stations KMPC and KABC (radio); Kate Nelson, owner of the Palace Theatre (live performance); and Mary Lou Dudas, vice president of A&M Records (recording industry). Since that 1999 announcement the chamber has revealed only that Lestz (who received his own star in 2004) became chairman after Grant died in 2008. Their current official position is that "each of the five categories is represented by someone with expertise in that field".

In 2010, Lestz was replaced as chairman by John Pavlik, former Director of Communications for the Academy of Motion Picture Arts and Sciences. While no public announcement was made to that effect, he was identified as chairman in the Chamber's press release announcing the 2011 star recipients.  The current chair, according to the Chamber's 2016 selection announcement, is film producer Maureen Schultz.

Rule adjustments 

Walk of Fame rules prohibit consideration of nominees whose contributions fall outside the five major entertainment categories, but the selection committee has been known to adjust interpretations of its rules to justify a selection. The Walk's four round Moon landing monuments at the corners of Hollywood and Vine, for example, officially recognize the Apollo 11 astronauts for "contributions to the television industry." Johnny Grant acknowledged, in 2005, that classifying the first Moon landing as a television entertainment event was "a bit of a stretch". Magic Johnson was added to the motion picture category based on his ownership of the Magic Johnson Theatre chain, citing as precedent Sid Grauman, builder of Grauman's Chinese Theatre.

Muhammad Ali's star was granted after the committee decided that boxing could be considered a form of "live performance." Its placement on a wall of the Dolby Theatre makes it the only star mounted on a vertical surface, acceding to Ali's request that his name not be walked upon, as he shared his name with the Prophet Muhammad.

All living honorees have been required since 1968 to personally attend their star's unveiling, and approximately 40 have declined the honor due to this condition. The only recipient to date who failed to appear after agreeing to do so was Barbra Streisand, in 1976. Her star was unveiled anyway, near the intersection of Hollywood and Highland. Streisand did attend when her husband, James Brolin, unveiled his star in 1998 two blocks to the east.

Entertainers on the Walk of Fame

Entertainers with multiple stars 
The original selection committees chose to recognize some notable entertainers' contributions in multiple categories with multiple stars.

Five 
Gene Autry is the only honoree with stars in all five categories.

Four 
Bob Hope, Mickey Rooney, Roy Rogers, and Tony Martin each have stars in four categories; Rooney has three of his own and a fourth with his eighth wife, Jan, while Rogers also has three of his own, and a fourth with his band, Sons of the Pioneers.

Three 

Thirty-three honorees, including Bing Crosby, Frank Sinatra, Jo Stafford, Dean Martin, Dinah Shore, Gale Storm, Danny Kaye, Douglas Fairbanks Jr., and Jack Benny, have stars in three categories.

Two 
Twelve have two stars:
 Dolly Parton, for her solo work and part of the trio made up of her, Emmylou Harris ​​and Linda Ronstadt;
 Michael Jackson, as a soloist and as a member of The Jacksons;
 Diana Ross, as a member of The Supremes and for her solo work; 
 Smokey Robinson, as a solo artist and as a member of The Miracles; 
 John Lennon, Paul McCartney, George Harrison, and Ringo Starr as individuals and as members of The Beatles. 
 George Eastman is the only honoree with two stars in the same category for the same achievement, the invention of roll film.
 Walt Disney, has stars in two different categories for his work in both film and television; in addition, Mickey Mouse (who was originally voiced by Walt Disney) and Disneyland have stars.
 Alfred Hitchcock has stars in two different categories for his work in both film and television.
 Jean Hersholt, for film and radio
Cher forfeited her opportunity to join this list by declining to schedule the mandatory personal appearance when she was selected in 1983. She did, however, attend the unveiling of the Sonny & Cher star in 1998, as a tribute to her recently deceased ex-husband, Sonny Bono.

Unique and unusual 
Sixteen stars are identified with a one-word stage name (e.g., Liberace, Pink, Roseanne, and Slash). Clayton Moore is so inextricably linked with his Lone Ranger character, even though he played other roles during his career, that he is one of only two actors to have his character's name alongside his own on his star. The other is Tommy Riggs, whose star references his Betty Lou character. The largest group of individuals represented by a single star is the estimated 122 adults and 12 children collectively known as the Munchkins, from the landmark 1939 film The Wizard of Oz.

Two pairs of stars share identical names representing different people. There are two Harrison Ford stars, honoring the silent film actor (at 6665 Hollywood Boulevard), and the present-day actor (in front of the Dolby Theatre at 6801 Hollywood Boulevard). Two Michael Jackson stars represent the singer (at 6927 Hollywood Boulevard), and the radio personality (at 1597 Vine Street). When the recording artist Jackson died in 2009, fans mistakenly began leaving flowers, candles, and other tributes at the Vine Street star.  Upon learning of this, the radio host wrote on his website, "I am willingly loan[ing] it to him and, if it would bring him back, he can have it."

The Westmores received the first star honoring contributions in theatrical make-up. Other make-up artists on the walk are Max Factor, John Chambers and Rick Baker. Three stars recognize experts in special effects: Ray Harryhausen, Dennis Muren, and Stan Winston. Only two costume designers have received a star: eight-time Academy Award Winner Edith Head, and the first African-American to win an Oscar for costume design, Ruth E. Carter.

Sidney Sheldon is one of two novelists with a star, which he earned for writing screenplays for such films as The Bachelor and the Bobby-Soxer (1947) before becoming a novelist. The other is Ray Bradbury, whose books and stories have formed the basis of dozens of movies and television programs over a nearly 60-year period.

Ten inventors have stars on the Walk: George Eastman, inventor of roll film; Thomas Edison, inventor of the first true film projector and holder of numerous patents related to motion-picture technology; Lee de Forest, inventor of the triode vacuum tube, which made radio and TV possible, and Phonofilm, which made sound films possible; Merian C. Cooper, co-inventor of the Cinerama process; Herbert Kalmus, inventor of Technicolor; Auguste and Louis Lumière, inventors of important components of the motion picture camera; Mark Serrurier, inventor of the technology used for film editing; Hedy Lamarr, co-inventor of a frequency-hopping radio guidance system that was a precursor to Wi-Fi networks and cellular telephone systems; and Ray Dolby, co-developer of the first video tape recorder and inventor of the Dolby noise-reduction system.

A few star recipients moved on after their entertainment careers to political notability. Two Presidents of the United States, Ronald Reagan (40th President) and Donald Trump (45th President) have stars on the Walk. Reagan is also one of two Governors of California with a star; the other is Arnold Schwarzenegger.  One U.S. senator (George Murphy) and two members of the U.S. House of Representatives (Helen Gahagan and Sonny Bono) have stars. Ignacy Paderewski, who served as Prime Minister of Poland between the World Wars, is the only European head of government represented. Film and stage actor Albert Dekker served one term in the California State Assembly during the 1940s.

On its 50th anniversary in 2005, Disneyland received a star near Disney's Soda Fountain on Hollywood Boulevard. Stars for commercial organizations are only considered for those with a Hollywood show business connection of at least 50 years' duration. While not technically part of the Walk itself (a city ordinance prohibits placing corporate names on sidewalks), the star was installed adjacent to it.

There are two dogs represented on the walk, Rin Tin Tin and Strongheart.

Fictional characters 

Some stars have been awarded to fictional characters. In 1978, in honor of his 50th anniversary, Mickey Mouse became the first animated character to receive a star, and nearly twenty more followed over the next decades. Other fictional characters on the Walk include the Munchkins (as mentioned earlier), one kaiju named Godzilla, the live-action dog named Lassie, Pee-Wee Herman, portrayed by Paul Reubens,  Shrek, Snow White and Rugrats.

Jim Henson is one of four puppeteers to have a star, but also has three stars dedicated to his creations: one for The Muppets as a whole, one for Kermit the Frog and one for Big Bird.

Errors 
In 2010, Julia Louis-Dreyfus's star was constructed with the name "Julia Luis Dreyfus". The actress was reportedly amused, and the error was corrected. A similar mistake was made on Dick Van Dyke's star in 1993 ("Vandyke"), and rectified. Film and television actor Don Haggerty's star originally displayed the first name "Dan". The mistake was fixed, but years later the television actor Dan Haggerty (of Grizzly Adams fame, no relation to Don) also received a star. The confusion eventually sprouted an urban legend that Dan Haggerty was the only honoree to have a star removed from the Walk of Fame. For 28 years, the star intended to honor Mauritz Stiller, the Helsinki-born pioneer of Swedish film who brought Greta Garbo to the United States, read "Maurice Diller", possibly due to mistranscription of verbal dictation. The star was finally remade with the correct name in 1988. 

Four stars remain misspelled: the opera star Lotte Lehmann (spelled "Lottie"); Cinerama co-inventor and King Kong creator, director, and producer Merian C. Cooper ("Meriam"); cinematography pioneer Auguste Lumière ("August"); and radio comedienne Mary Livingstone ("Livingston").

Monty Woolley, the veteran film and stage actor best known for The Man Who Came to Dinner (1942) and the line "Time flies when you're having fun", is officially listed in the motion picture category, but his star on the Walk of Fame bears the television emblem. Woolley did appear on the small screen late in his career, but his TV contributions were eclipsed by his extensive stage, film, and radio work. Similarly, the star of film actress Carmen Miranda bears the TV emblem, although her official category is motion pictures.  Radio and television talk show host Larry King is officially a television honoree, but his star displays a film camera.

Controversial additions 
Charlie Chaplin is the only honoree to be selected twice for the same star on the Walk. He was unanimously voted into the initial group of 500 in 1956, but the Selection Committee ultimately excluded him, ostensibly due to questions regarding his morals (he had been charged with violating the Mann Act—and exonerated—during the White Slavery hysteria of the 1940s), but more likely due to his left-leaning political views. The rebuke prompted an unsuccessful lawsuit by his son, Charles Chaplin Jr. Chaplin's star was finally added to the Walk in 1972, the same year he received his Academy Award. Even then, 16 years later, the Chamber of Commerce received angry letters from across the country protesting its decision to include him.

The committee's Chaplin difficulties reportedly contributed to its decision in 1978 against awarding a star to Paul Robeson, the controversial opera singer, actor, athlete, writer, lawyer and social activist. The resulting outcry from the entertainment industry, civic circles, local and national politicians, and many other quarters was so intense that the decision was reversed and Robeson was awarded a star in 1979.

Theft and vandalism 
Acts of vandalism on the Walk of Fame have ranged from profanity and political statements written on stars with markers and paint to damage with heavy tools. Vandals have also tried to chisel out the brass category emblems embedded in the stars below the names, and have even stolen a statue component of The Four Ladies of Hollywood.  Closed circuit surveillance cameras have been installed on the stretch of Hollywood Boulevard between La Brea Avenue and Vine Street in an effort to discourage mischievous activities.

Four of the stars, which weigh about  each, have been stolen from the Walk of Fame. In 2000, James Stewart's and Kirk Douglas's stars disappeared from their locations near the intersection of Hollywood and Vine, where they had been temporarily removed for a construction project. Police recovered them in the suburban community of South Gate when they arrested a man involved in an incident there and searched his house. The suspect was a construction worker employed on the Hollywood and Vine project. The stars had been badly damaged, and had to be remade. One of Gene Autry's five stars was also stolen from a construction area. Another theft occurred in 2005 when thieves used a concrete saw to remove Gregory Peck's star from its Hollywood Boulevard site at the intersection of North El Centro Avenue, near North Gower. The star was replaced almost immediately, but the original was never recovered and the perpetrators never caught.

Donald Trump's star

Donald Trump's star has been vandalized multiple times. During the 2016 presidential election, a man named James Otis, who claims to be an heir to the Otis Elevator Company fortune, used a sledge hammer and a pickaxe to destroy all of the star's brass inlays. He readily admitted to the vandalism and was arrested and sentenced to three years' probation.  The star was repaired and served as a site of pro-Trump demonstrations until it was destroyed a second time in July 2018 by a man named Austin Clay. Clay later surrendered himself to the police and was bailed out by James Otis.  Clay was sentenced to one day in jail, three years of probation, and 20 days of community service. He also was ordered to attend psychological counseling and pay restitution of $9,404.46 to the Hollywood Chamber of Commerce. On December 18, 2018, the star was defaced with swastikas and other graffiti drawn in permanent marker, and it was vandalized yet again on October 2, 2020.

In August 2018, the West Hollywood City Council unanimously passed a resolution requesting permanent removal of the star due to repeated vandalism, according to Mayor John Duran. The resolution was completely symbolic, as West Hollywood has no jurisdiction over the Walk. Activist groups have also called for the removal of stars honoring individuals whose public and professional lives have become controversial, including Trump, Bill Cosby, Kevin Spacey, and Brett Ratner. In answer to these campaigns, the Hollywood Chamber of Commerce announced that because the Walk is a historical landmark, "once a star has been added ... it is considered a part of the historic fabric of the Hollywood Walk of Fame" and cannot be removed.

Hollywood and La Brea Gateway 

The Hollywood and La Brea Gateway is a 1993 cast stainless steel public art installation by architect Catherine Hardwicke. The sculpture, popularly known as The Four Ladies of Hollywood, was commissioned by the Los Angeles Community Redevelopment Agency Art Program as a tribute to the multi-ethnic women of the entertainment industry. The installation consists of a square stainless steel Art Deco-style structure or gazebo, with an arched roof supporting a circular dome that is topped by a central obelisk with descending neon block letters spelling "Hollywood" on each of its four sides. Atop the obelisk is a small gilded weather vane-style sculpture of Marilyn Monroe in her iconic billowing skirt pose from The Seven Year Itch. The corners of the domed structure are supported by four caryatids sculpted by Harl West representing African-American actress Dorothy Dandridge, Asian-American actress Anna May Wong, Mexican actress Dolores del Río, and Brooklyn-born actress Mae West.  The installation stands at the western end of the Hollywood Walk of Fame at the corner of Hollywood Boulevard and North La Brea Avenue.

The gazebo was dedicated on February 1, 1994, to a mixed reception. Los Angeles Times art critic Christopher Knight called it "the most depressingly awful work of public art in recent years", representing the opposite of Hardwicke's intended tribute to women. "Sex, as a woman's historic gateway to Hollywood", he wrote, "couldn't be more explicitly described".

Independent writer and film producer Gail Choice called it a fitting tribute to a group of pioneering and courageous women who "carried a tremendous burden on their feminine shoulders". "Never in my wildest dreams did I believe I'd ever see women of color immortalized in such a creative and wonderful fashion." Hardwicke contended that critics had missed the "humor and symbolism" of the structure, which "embraces and pokes fun at the glamour, the polished metallic male form of the Oscar, and the pastiche of styles and dreams that pervades Tinseltown."

In June 2019, the Marilyn Monroe statue above the gazebo was stolen by a man who had vandalized Donald Trump's star a year earlier.

Homage 

Some fans show respect for star recipients both living and dead by laying flowers or other symbolic tributes at their stars. Others show their support in other ways; the star awarded to Julio Iglesias, for example, is kept in "pristine condition [by] a devoted band of elderly women [who] scrub and polish it once a month".

The Hollywood Chamber of Commerce has adopted the tradition of placing flower wreaths at the stars of newly deceased awardees; for example, Bette Davis in 1989, Katharine Hepburn in 2003, and Jackie Cooper in 2011. The stars of other deceased celebrities, such as Michael Jackson, Farrah Fawcett, Elizabeth Taylor, Charles Aznavour, Richard Pryor, Ricardo Montalbán, James Doohan, Frank Sinatra, Robin Williams, Joan Rivers, George Harrison, Aretha Franklin, Stan Lee, and Betty White have become impromptu memorial and vigil sites as well, and some continue to receive anniversary remembrances.

See also 

 List of halls and walks of fame

Notes

References

External links 

 
 Hollywood Chamber of Commerce Walk of Fame videos – YouTube
 Hollywood Chamber of Commerce
 Hollywood Star Walk map: Los Angeles Times
 Hollywood Star Walk list: Los Angeles Times
 Hollywood Star Template

 
Walks of fame
Walk of Fame
Walk of Fame
Entertainment halls of fame
Halls of fame in California
1958 establishments in California
Los Angeles Historic-Cultural Monuments
Tourist attractions in Los Angeles